Melanoplus flavidus, known generally as yellowish spur-throat grasshopper, is a species of spur-throated grasshopper in the family Acrididae. Other common names include the blue-legged locust and blue-legged grasshopper. It is found in North America.

Subspecies
These two subspecies belong to the species Melanoplus flavidus:
 Melanoplus flavidus elongatus b
 Melanoplus flavidus favidus b
Data sources: i = ITIS, c = Catalogue of Life, g = GBIF, b = Bugguide.net

References

External links

 

Melanoplinae
Articles created by Qbugbot
Insects described in 1878